Tasya Fantasya is a 2008 Philippine television drama fantasy romance series broadcast by GMA Network. The series is based on a 1994 Philippine film of the same title. Directed by Mac Alejandre, it stars Yasmien Kurdi in the title role. It premiered on April 6, 2008 replacing Kapuso Sine Specials. The series concluded on July 13, 2008 with a total of 15 episodes.

A remake was aired on TV5 in 2016.

Premise
Tasya, a sales assistant in an optical shop, who willfully yearns for her Prince Charming’s affection. But she quickly finds out that her fate is entangled with that of a magical pair of eyeglasses that will lead her to a series of colorful adventures.

Tasya was orphaned at a very young age and adopted by her abusive Aunt Kelay. But Tasya, being the simple and benevolent person that she is, ignores her aunt's awfulness.

She escapes from her unpleasant world in her dreams and fantasies of spending romantic moments with her Prince Charming, Donald, the optical shop's handsome model; and so her best friend Mateng, who patiently listens to her fantasies, dubs her Tasya Fantasya.

Cast and characters

Lead cast
 Yasmien Kurdi as Tasya / Anastacia

Supporting cast
 Wendell Ramos as Donald / Federico
 Rainier Castillo as Raz
 Gladys Reyes as Mateng
 Alicia Mayer as Brigida / Virtuosa
 Mura as Pookalakala
 Vangie Labalan as Kelay

Ratings
According to AGB Nielsen Philippines' Mega Manila household television ratings, the pilot episode of Tasya Fantasya earned a 15.7% rating. While the final episode scored a 9.5% rating.

Accolades

References

External links
 

2008 Philippine television series debuts
2008 Philippine television series endings
Fantaserye and telefantasya
GMA Network drama series